Michael Ludwig (born 3 April 1961) is an Austrian politician of the Social Democratic Party (SPÖ). Since May 2018, he has been Mayor and Governor of Vienna, the capital and largest city of Austria. Since January 2018, he has also served as chairman of SPÖ Vienna. Prior, he was City Councillor for Housing, Construction, and Urban Renewal from January 2007 until his election as mayor. He was also Second Deputy Mayor and Governor of Vienna from March 2009 to October 2010.

Personal life
Ludwig grew up in Vienna's 21st district, Floridsdorf, living in a Gemeindebau (municipal housing estate). He grew up under the governments of SPÖ Chancellor Bruno Kreisky, who he cites as his political idol. After finishing primary school, Michael Ludwig attended the lower level of a general high school in Vienna from 1971. He then attended the commercial academy all the way 1975 to 1980 and graduated from it with the Matura. After serving military service from 1981 to 1982, he studied political science and history at the University of Vienna and was awarded a doctorate in 1992 with a dissertation on the SED, the then-ruling party of East Germany.

In 1984–1986 he was course and project leader in adult education, and from 1986 to 1991 an educational assistant at a Viennese adult education centre. In 1991 he became regional office manager of the Dr. Karl Renner Institute Vienna and education secretary of the SPÖ Vienna. From 1995 he was chairman of the Association of Viennese Adult Education and Vice President of the Austrian Adult Education Centres, and since 2008 he has been honorary chairman of the supervisory board of Wiener Volkshochschulen GmbH. Ludwig is also chairman of the Bruno Kreisky Archive.

In August 2018, Ludwig married his longtime partner Irmtraud Rossgatterer.

Political career
Ludwig began his career in local politics in Vienna as a district councillor in Floridsdorf from 1994 to 1995. He then served as a representative on the Federal Council from 1996 to 1999. In 1999, he entered the Gemeinderat and Landtag of Vienna.

In January 2007, Ludwig was appointed City Councillor for Housing, Construction, and Urban Renewal, succeeding Werner Faymann. Following the resignation of Grete Laska, Ludwig became second Deputy Mayor of the 26 March 2009. He left office after the 2010 state election, when Maria Vassilakou of The Greens was appointed instead.

In 2010, Ludwig took over the chairmanship of the SPÖ Floridsdorf from Kurt Eder. On 28 May 2011, he was elected one of five deputy chairmen at the SPÖ Vienna state party conference.

In the lead-up to the 2017 federal election, Ludwig spoke out against the prospect of a coalition between the SPÖ and Freedom Party of Austria (FPÖ), claiming the parties had too little in common.

In 2017, long-serving Mayor and Governor Michael Häupl announced his pending retirement. At the extraordinary state party conference of the SPÖ Vienna on 27 January 2018, Ludwig was elected to succeed him as chairman of the SPÖ Vienna, winning 57 percent of the delegate votes against opponent Andreas Schieder. He is said to have had support from representatives of the Viennese SPÖ in the large districts of Floridsdorf and Donaustadt.

Ludwig was elected Mayor and Governor on 24 May 2018.

References

1961 births
Living people
Social Democratic Party of Austria politicians
Mayors of Vienna